Wayne Kramer (born 26 May 1965) is a filmmaker and storyboard artist. Kramer has written and directed films such as the 2003 film The Cooler, which garnered an Oscar nomination for its star Alec Baldwin, as well as two Golden Globe nominations for Baldwin and Maria Bello. He also adapted his 1995 short film "Crossing Over" into a feature-length version which starred Harrison Ford, Ray Liotta, Ashley Judd and Jim Sturgess, and was released by the Weinstein Company in 2009. He also wrote the screenplay for the film Mindhunters, but the final script was heavily rewritten by others and bore little resemblance to Kramer's original work.

Career
Kramer first began directing with the 1992 film Blazeland, which was never completed. Kramer has since commented that the process was "an absolute nightmare from beginning to end" and that he has no plans to finish or release the film. His first official release, The Cooler, was selected for competition in the 2003 Sundance Film Festival. Later the same year The Cooler received a 2003 Special Mention for Excellence in Filmmaking from the National Board of Review. A year later, he was nominated for a Golden Satellite Award and an Edgar Allan Poe Award for writing the film's screenplay.

In 2006, Kramer directed the action thriller Running Scared for Media 8 Entertainment. The film starred Paul Walker and Cameron Bright. Although Running Scared did not fare well at the box office, it has gone on to become a hugely profitable DVD title for Media 8.

In 2006, Kramer was one of several filmmakers interviewed for the Kirby Dick documentary This Film Is Not Yet Rated, in which he discusses the apparent absurdity of the fact The Cooler was given an NC-17 certificate by the MPAA simply due to a few seconds long shot of its lead actress' pubic hair.

Kramer directed Pawn Shop Chronicles, which was released on 12 July 2013. The film starred Vincent D'Onofrio, Chi McBride, Paul Walker, Kevin Rankin, Matt Dillon, Elijah Wood, and Brendan Fraser.

Filmography

Recurring contributors

References

External links 
 
 
 

1965 births
Living people
South African screenwriters
South African film directors
American film directors